Eszter Povázsay (born 14 November 1990 in Budapest) is a Hungarian swimmer, who specialized in backstroke events. She is a five-time All-Big East performer, a varsity swimmer for the Louisville Cardinals, and a marketing student at the University of Louisville in Louisville, Kentucky.

Povazsay qualified for the women's 100 m backstroke at the 2012 Summer Olympics in London by clearing a FINA B-standard entry time of 1:02.38 at the European Championships in Debrecen. She challenged seven other swimmers on the second heat, including three-time Olympians Anja Čarman of Slovenia and Sanja Jovanović of Croatia. She was faster than Kazakhstan's Yekaterina Rudenko to grab a sixth spot by 0.09 of a second in 1:03.55. Povazsay failed to advance into the semifinals, as she placed thirty-seventh overall in the preliminaries.

References

External links
 Player Bio – Louisville Cardinals
 NBC Olympics Profile

1990 births
Living people
Olympic swimmers of Hungary
Swimmers at the 2012 Summer Olympics
Hungarian female backstroke swimmers
Swimmers from Budapest
Louisville Cardinals women's swimmers
20th-century Hungarian women
21st-century Hungarian women